Ariel Hernán Cháves (born 20 February 1992) is an Argentine professional footballer who plays as a left winger for Alvarado.

Career
Chávez's senior career began in 2013 with Almagro of Primera B Metropolitana. He participated in fifty-four fixtures and scored three goals across his first three seasons, including one in twenty-five fixtures during 2015 as Almagro won promotion to Primera B Nacional. Chávez scored his first goal at tier two level on 11 July 2017 during a 2–0 victory over Brown. He departed them a year later, leaving after seven goals in one hundred and twenty-seven matches in all competitions. Chávez joined Argentine Primera División side Colón in August 2018. His only appearance for the club came versus Independiente on 15 September, which they lost 3–0.

In January 2019, Chávez completed a move to Ecuadorian Serie A team Guayaquil City. He left the club at the end of 2020. In March 2021, Chávez returned to his homeland and joined San Martín de Tucumán. Ahead of the 2022 season, Chávez moved to fellow league club Alvarado.

Career statistics
.

References

External links

1992 births
Living people
Argentine footballers
Argentine expatriate footballers
Footballers from Buenos Aires
Association football midfielders
Primera B Metropolitana players
Primera Nacional players
Argentine Primera División players
Club Almagro players
Club Atlético Colón footballers
Guayaquil City F.C. footballers
San Martín de Tucumán footballers
Club Atlético Alvarado players
Expatriate footballers in Ecuador
Argentine expatriate sportspeople in Ecuador